Pasta con le sarde is a Sicilian dish of pasta with sardines and anchovies. It is recognized as a traditional Italian food product in the Prodotto agroalimentare tradizionale scheme of the Italian government. It is most associated with Sicily's capital Palermo, but it can be found all over the island.

Ingredients 
The principal ingredients are olive oil, onions, pasta and a finely chopped mixture of sardines and anchovy. Various types of pasta are used for the dish, but bucatini is traditional. Wild fennel, saffron, pine nuts, raisins and salt are added to flavor the dish. To finish the dish it is topped with toasted breadcrumbs. Fresh sardines are preferable, but if these are not available canned sardines can be used. Wild fennel is plentiful in Sicily, but might be hard to find elsewhere; if unobtainable, the tops of ordinary fennel may be used instead.

Some variations use tomato sauce. Cookbook author Pino Correnti argues that the tomato-less recipe published in 1886 by the folklorist Giuseppe Pitrè is the only authentic version.

Cultural references
In an interview with CNN's Piers Morgan, late justice of the Supreme Court of the United States Antonin Scalia stated, in response to his interviewer's query, that "pasta con sarde" is his favorite pasta dish.

References 

Palermitan cuisine
Cuisine of Sicily
Pasta dishes
Anchovy dishes